The Church of Saint Mary of the Rose (italian: chiesa di Santa Maria della Rosa) is located in Chianciano Terme.

History
The building was erected between 1585 and 1599 on the site where the church of Santa Maria in Carcere or delle Nevi had stood since 1346. The building was designed by the architect Baldassarre Lanci from Urbino, who had been working for the Grand Dukes of Tuscany since 1557. According to popular tradition, the church was built at the initiative of the Chianciano farmers who, feeling unwelcome in the Collegiate Church by the villagers, decided to build a church that would surpass all comparisons.

Description
The church has a Greek-cross plan with a semicircular apse. The arms of the church join under the square tiburium forming a dome surmounted by a polygonal lantern. Architectural and decorative elements in travertine stand out from the brickwork. 
The dome, also called a "false dome," is a work of Leonardo De Vegni from 1766 and is divided by eight pairs of pillars framing four niches with statues of saints and four windows. The interior of the dome was painted by the Sienese painter Giovan Battista Marchetti and later decorated with stucco. 
The interior contains a fresco attributed to an unknown Sienese painter depicting the Madonna handing a white rose to baby Jesus between St. John the Baptist and St. Bartholomew, protectors of Chianciano, painted between 1370 and 1400. This fresco gave the church its name.
The fresco comes from the suppressed church of the Madonna delle Nevi, once located in Pietriccia, in the so-called prisons quarter (Italian: contrada delle carceri). 
Another fresco, the so-called Madonna of the prisons (Italian: Madonna delle carceri), is a 14th-century Sienese work.

Bibliography
Maria Gabriella Capece, Chianciano Terme, Florence, Franco Cantini Editore, 1997, pp. 48-50.
Parrocchie.it - Chiese di Chianciano

Chianciano Terme